Roberto Velasco Álvarez is Chief Officer for the North America Unit at the Mexican Secretariat of Foreign Affairs. He is currently in charge of leading Mexico's foreign policy for the United States and Canada.

Political career 
Roberto Velasco Álvarez (born September 14, 1987) holds a master's degree in Public Policy from the University of Chicago Harris School of Public Policy with a concentration in Finance and a Bachelor of Arts in Law from the Universidad Iberoamericana in Mexico City.

In December 2018, he was appointed General Director for Communications and Public Affairs by Secretary Marcelo Ebrard at the Mexican Secretariat of Foreign Affairs. 

In 2019, he was part of the Mexican delegation that discussed the ratification of the United States-Mexico-Canada Agreement (USMCA) with representatives from the U.S. Congress and government.

In June 2020 he became Director General for North America. and in December 2020 he became Acting Under Secretary for North America after his predecessor Jesús Seade Kuri was named ambassador to the People's Republic of China. As of June 2021 he was appointed as Chief Officer for the North America Unit. In October 2020, he worked with the Mexican team to reach a deal with the United States on Transnational Water Management.

References

Living people
1987 births